The statue of Saint Anne is an outdoor sculpture by Matěj Václav Jäckel, installed on the north side of the Charles Bridge in Prague, Czech Republic.

External links

 

Christian sculptures
Monuments and memorials in Prague
Sculptures depicting New Testament people
Sculptures of women in Prague
Statues on the Charles Bridge
Saint Anne